Edifici Tarragona is a skyscraper in Barcelona, Catalonia, Spain. Completed in 1998, has 22 floors and rises 78 metres. Lies on Carrer de Tarragona street 159, near Plaça d'Espanya and three other skyscrapers: Edificio Allianz, Hotel Torre Catalunya, Torre Núñez y Navarro.

See also 

 List of tallest buildings and structures in Barcelona

References 

Skyscraper office buildings in Barcelona
Office buildings completed in 1998